John Kevin Tice (born June 22, 1960 in Bayshore, New York) is an American football coach and former tight end who played ten seasons in the National Football League for the New Orleans Saints. He is currently the offensive line coach/co-offensive coordinator at Pace University, a Division II school in the Northeast 10 Conference. He was inducted into the Suffolk Sports Hall of Fame on Long Island in the Football Category with the Class of 2013.
He is also the younger brother of Mike Tice, a former Quarterback Maryland and in the NFL, and former head coach of the Minnesota Vikings. He was an assistant coach for the Vikings in Mike's tenure.

References

External links

1960 births
Living people
American football tight ends
Army Black Knights football coaches
Maryland Terrapins football players
New Orleans Saints players
Minnesota Vikings coaches
New York Sentinels coaches
People from Bay Shore, New York